The 2000 Heineken Cup Final was the final match of the 1999–2000 Heineken Cup, the fifth season of Europe's top club rugby union competition. The match was played on 27 May 2000 at Twickenham Stadium in London. The match was contested by Northampton Saints of England and Munster of Ireland. Northampton Saints won the match 9–8.

Match details

See also
1999–2000 Heineken Cup

References

Final
2000
2000 sports events in London
Rugby union in London
1999–2000 in Irish rugby union
1999–2000 in English rugby union
Munster Rugby matches
Northampton Saints matches